End of Summer is a 1977 Australian television film directed by Oscar Whitbread and written by Cliff Green. 
With a story concerning rural depression and a family leaving their farm, it was adapted from Green's earlier screenplay Moving On for the Commonwealth Film Unit.

The cast includes Tony Bonner, Rosalind Speirs, John Nash, Syd Conabere and Ivor Bowyer.

It was first broadcast as part of the ABC's Stuart Wagstaff's World Playhouse series.

End of Summer received the 1978 Sammy Award for Best TV Play.

References 

Australian television films
Australian Broadcasting Corporation original programming